Samuel Horouta Emery (1885 – 20 April 1967) was a New Zealand labourer, farmer, rugby player, storekeeper, carrier, businessman, local politician. Of Māori descent, he identified with the Ngāti Mahuta, Ngāti Maniapoto, Ngāti Pūkeko and Waikato iwi. He was born in Kakepuku, Waikato, New Zealand, on 1885.

In 1953, Emery was awarded the Queen Elizabeth II Coronation Medal.

References

1885 births
1967 deaths
Māori politicians
New Zealand farmers
20th-century New Zealand businesspeople
Ngāti Mahuta people
Ngāti Maniapoto people
Ngāti Awa people
Waikato Tainui people
New Zealand Māori sportspeople